The 1969–70 Divizia B was the 30th season of the second tier of the Romanian football league system.

The format has been maintained to two series, each of them having 16 teams. At the end of the season the winners of the series promoted to Divizia A and the last two places from each series relegated to Divizia C.

Team changes

To Divizia B
Promoted from Divizia C
 Metalul Târgoviște
 Olimpia Satu Mare
 Știința Bacău
 Minerul Anina

Relegated from Divizia A
 Progresul București
 Vagonul Arad

From Divizia B
Relegated to Divizia C
 CFR Pașcani
 Medicina Cluj
 Electronica Obor București
 IS Câmpia Turzii

Promoted to Divizia A
 Steagul Roșu Brașov
 CFR Cluj

Renamed teams 
AS Cugir was renamed as Metalurgistul Cugir.

Politehnica București was renamed as Sportul Studențesc București.

Serie I

League table

Serie I results

Serie I positions by round

Serie II

League table

Serie II results

Serie II positions by round

See also 
 1969–70 Divizia A
 1969–70 Divizia C
 1969–70 County Championship

References

Liga II seasons
Romania
2